Makena is a census-designated place (CDP) in Maui County, Hawaii, United States. As of the 2020 census, it had a population of 196, up from 99 in 2010. Prior to 2010, the area was part of the Wailea-Makena census-designated place.

Geography

Makena is located on the south side of the island of Maui at  (20.6539, -156.4403). It is bordered to the north by Wailea and to the west by the Pacific Ocean. Road access is only available from the north, by Makena Road.

Climate

Demographics

See also
List of beaches in Hawaii#Maui
Makena Beach & Golf Resort - A hotel/ resort in the Makena area.

References

External links
 
 Daily newspaper

Census-designated places in Maui County, Hawaii
Populated places on Maui
Populated coastal places in Hawaii